The Bemerton Estate is a social housing estate to the north of Bingfield Street and west of Caledonian Road, in the London Borough of Islington. It was built in the late 1960s and early 1970s, and named after Bemerton Street, the northern part of which it replaced.

The estate has suffered from crime and anti-social behaviour and was considered for demolition but the plans were rejected as uneconomic in 2011. In 2015, a tenant's management organisation on the estate was wound up after its chairman was jailed for sex offences. The estate has become synonymous with the gap between the rich and poor in Islington.

References

External links

Barnsbury
Housing estates in the London Borough of Islington